Linus Patrick Power (born 11 October 1972) is an Australian politician. He has been the Labor member for Logan in the Queensland Legislative Assembly since 2015. Power has completed degrees at both Griffith, in Queensland, and Harvard, in the United States.

References

Living people
Members of the Queensland Legislative Assembly
Australian Labor Party members of the Parliament of Queensland
Australian people of Irish descent
21st-century Australian politicians
Griffith University alumni
Harvard Kennedy School alumni
1972 births
Labor Right politicians
20th-century Australian people